Stresemann is a German family name which may refer to:

 Christina Stresemann (born 1957), German judge; daughter of Wolfgang Stresemann
 Erwin Stresemann (1889 – 1972), German ornithologist
 Gustav Stresemann (1878 – 1929), German politician and statesman
 Gustav Stresemann Business School, Mainz, Germany
 Käte Stresemann (1883 – 1970), socialite and wife of Gustav Stresemann
 Wolfgang Stresemann (1904 – 1998), German jurist, conductor and composer; son of Gustav Stresemann

Stresemann is also the German name for the stroller suit, named after Gustav Stresemann.